Gioseni is a commune in Bacău County, Western Moldavia, Romania. It is composed of a single village, Gioseni. It was part of Tamași Commune until 2005, when it was split off.

References

Communes in Bacău County
Localities in Western Moldavia